The 2011 Patriot League men's basketball tournament was held in early March 2011, with the quarterfinals occurring March 2, semi-finals on March 6, and the championship game on March 11. The games were played at campus sites for the highest-seeded team playing in the game. In the championship game, Bucknell beat Lafayette at home to win its third Patriot League men's basketball championship.  Bucknell also received an automatic bid to the NCAA tournament, where it lost to eventual national champion Connecticut in the first round.

Bracket

* denotes game ended in overtime.

References

Tournament
Patriot League men's basketball tournament
Patriot League men's basketball tournament